Kalu Egbui Ikeagwu  is a British-Nigerian actor and writer. As an actor, he has received several awards and nominations for his performances on screen.

Early life
Kalu was born in England but was relocated to Nigeria by his dad at the age of 9 due to fears from his parents that he might abandon his Igbo roots. He had his primary education in England and Zambia before proceeding to University of Nigeria to get a degree in English.

Career 
Ikeagwu's first appearance on screen was in 2005 in the popular Domino TV series. His first stage performance was in Put Out The Houselights by Esiaba Ironsi. He has gone on to act in some of Nigeria's memorable classics, such as "Major Lejoka Brown" in Ola Rotimi's, Our Husband Has Gone Mad Again and as "RIP" in Esiaba Irobi's Hangmen Also Die. He went on to perform in various plays at the Edinburgh Festivals of 1995 and 1997.
His first feature film was the role of "David Salako" in Emem Isong's For Real, After completion of the film, Kalu claimed that if a Danfo (Lagos metro bus) were to hit him, he would die with a blissful smile on his face. He has featured in many films including 30 Days, The Wrong Woman, Distance Between, Between Two Worlds and the  Irish film production "Rapt In Éire". On television, he has starred in many popular series including Domino, 168 and Doctors' Quarters (MNet Production ). He is also known for his role as "Alahji Abubakar" a.k.a. Masters in the Nigerian hit TV series Tinsel.

Kalu Ikeagwu has starred in many movies recently. He is a talented actor who has appeared in movies like 30 Days, Domino, Accident, Broken, Damage, Two Brides and a Baby and a host of other movies. A recap of the trailers of his top five movies he acted in.

In 2019, Ikeagwu featured in “Three Thieves”, written by the trio Sammy Egbemawei, Abba Makama, and Africa Ukoh; and featuring Angel Unigwe. The movie released to cinemas in Nigeria on 4 October had Babtunwa Aderinokun and Uche Okocha as the Executive Producer and producer respectively.

Filmography

Films 

 Second Chances(2014) as Osagie
 Kafa Coh
 30 Days
 The Distance Between Between Two Worlds Love my way The Wrong Woman Fragile Pain For Real Games Men Play Insecurity Crisis In Paradise War Without End My Precious Son Beneath Her Veil Damage Daniel's Destiny Plan Lionheart Pretty Angels The Lost Maiden Darkest Night Freedom Bank The Waiting Years Ocean Deep Count On Me Two Brides and a Baby Broken (2013)
 Accident Blue Flames (2014)
Heaven's Hell (2015)
 O-Town (film) (2015)
 My rich boyfriend
 Three Thieves (2015)
 The Women (2018)
 Badamasi (2020)

Television
 Domino
 Doctors' Quarters
 168
 Circle Of Three
 Super Story
 Tinsel
 Diiche

Accolades

References

External links 

Kalu Ikeagwu's Blog
http://africamagic.dstv.com/category/shows/tinsel/

Living people
1972 births
20th-century Nigerian male actors
21st-century Nigerian male actors
Black British male actors
British emigrants to Nigeria
English people of Igbo descent
English people of Nigerian descent
Igbo male actors
Nigerian male film actors
Nigerian male stage actors
Nigerian male television actors
People from Anambra State
University of Nigeria alumni